Michael Tregury, in French Michel Trégore or Trégorre (died 1471), was Archbishop of Dublin from 1450 to 1471.

Life
Michael Tregury was born in the parish of St Wenn in Cornwall. He was educated at the University of Oxford, and was at some time Fellow of Exeter College, Oxford. He is said to have been an outstanding scholar.

He was chaplain to Henry VI of England and a distinguished scholar. He became the first rector of the University of Caen in 1439. He was Archdeacon of Barnstaple from 1445 to 1449. He was consecrated in St. Patrick's Cathedral, Dublin and was Archbishop of Dublin from 1450 to 1471.

In 1451 more than fifty people from his diocese went to Rome to celebrate the jubilee then promulgated by Pope Nicholas V. Those who returned safely in 1453 brought the sad news that Constantinople was taken by the Turks, and the Emperor Palaiologos slain. Archbishop Michael was so afflicted at the news that he proclaimed a fast to be observed strictly throughout his diocese for three successive days, and granted indulgences to those who observed it, he himself walking in procession before his clergy to Christ Church Cathedral, Dublin, and clothed in sackcloth and ashes.

In 1453 he was taken prisoner in  Dublin Bay by pirates, who were carrying off some ships from the harbour of Dublin. They were pursued to Ardglass, in County Down; five hundred and twenty of them were slain and the prelate released.

Like his predecessor Archbishop Talbot, he evidently had something of a temper: in 1465 he was accused in Parliament of assaulting Stephen Fitzwilliam. He was a noted music lover, and owned a pair of organs, which he bequeathed  to St Patrick's Cathedral.

Having presided over his see for twenty years, he died on 21 December 1471, at a very advanced age, in the manor-house of Tallaght, which he had previously repaired. His remains were conveyed to Dublin attended by the clergy and citizens, and were buried in St. Patrick's Cathedral, Dublin.

Burial
He was buried in Dublin and his epitaph reads:

Preasul Metropolis Michael hic Dublinenus
Marmore tumbatus, pro me Christum flagitetis 
which translates as
Here's Michael the Prelate of Dublin See, 
In Marble intomb'd, invoke Christ for me.

References 

Archbishops of Dublin
15th-century Roman Catholic archbishops in Ireland
Year of birth missing
Academic staff of the University of Caen Normandy
1471 deaths
Medieval Cornish people
Burials at St Patrick's Cathedral, Dublin
Honorary Chaplains to the Queen
Archdeacons of Barnstaple
Alumni of the University of Oxford